Denmark was represented by the band Mabel, with the song "Boom Boom", at the 1978 Eurovision Song Contest, which took place on 22 April in Paris. "Boom Boom" was chosen as the Danish entry at the Dansk Melodi Grand Prix on 25 February, and marked Denmark's return to Eurovision after an 11-year absence.

Before Eurovision

Dansk Melodi Grand Prix 1978 
The Dansk Melodi Grand Prix 1978 was held at the Tivoli Concert Hall in Copenhagen, hosted by Jørgen Mylius. The musical director was Ole Kurt Jensen. Six songs took part with the winner being decided by votes from eight regional juries.

Other participants in the 1978 DMGP included both Denmark's first Eurovision winner, Grethe Ingmann, and their eventual second winners, the Olsen Brothers.

At Eurovision 
On the night of the final Mabel performed 16th in the running order, following Greece and preceding Luxembourg. At the close of voting "Boom Boom" had received 13 points, placing Denmark 16th of the 20 entries. The Danish jury awarded its 12 points to Spain.

Voting

References 

1978
Countries in the Eurovision Song Contest 1978
Eurovision